The 1969 International Cross Country Championships was held in Clydebank, Scotland, at the Dalmuir Park on 22 March 1969.   A report on the men's event was given in the Glasgow Herald.

Complete results for men, junior men,  women, medallists, 
 and the results of British athletes were published.

Medallists

Individual Race Results

Men's (7.5 mi / 12.0 km)

Junior Men's (4.35 mi / 7.0 km)

Women's (2.5 mi / 4.0 km)

Team Results

Men's

Junior Men's

Women's

Participation
An unofficial count yields the participation of 193 athletes from 14 countries.

 (14)
 (12)
 (20)
 (9)
 (20)
 (14)
 (15)
 (14)
 (20)
 (14)
 (1)
 (7)
 (13)
 (20)

See also
 1969 in athletics (track and field)

References

International Cross Country Championships
International Cross Country Championships
Cross
International Cross Country Championships
International Cross Country Championships 
Cross country running in the United Kingdom
Clydebank
Sport in West Dunbartonshire
20th century in West Dunbartonshire